Dutch euro coins currently use two designs by Erwin Olaf, both of which feature a portrait of King Willem-Alexander of the Netherlands. The new designs began circulating in 2014. Dutch Euro coins minted from 1999 to 2013 feature a portrait of Queen Beatrix designed by Bruno Ninaber van Eyben. All coins share the 12 stars of the EU and the year of imprint in their design.

As is the case in Finland, most Dutch shops have elected not to issue one and two cent coins starting on 1 September 2004, though the coins remain legal tender. Sums are rounded to the nearest five cents; sums ending in 1, 2, 6 or 7 cents are rounded down, and those ending in 3, 4, 8 or 9 cents are rounded up. The rounding is applied to the grand total only, while individual prices are still shown and summed up with €0.01 precision. This method is known as "Swedish rounding".

Dutch euro design
For images of the common side and a detailed description of the coins, see euro coins.

First series (1999–2013): Queen Beatrix

Second series (2014–present): King Willem Alexander
Following the accession to the throne of King Willem-Alexander, a new series of euro coins was issued depicting the effigy of the new Head of State.

Circulating mintage quantities

Changes to national sides 

The Commission of the European Communities issued a recommendation on 19 December 2008, a common guideline for the national sides and the issuance of euro coins intended for circulation. One section of this recommendation stipulates that:

Article 4. Design of the national sides:
"The national side of the euro coins intended for circulation should bear the 12 European stars that should fully surround the national design, including the year mark and the indication of the issuing Member State's name. The European stars should be depicted as on the European flag."

The first series of the Dutch euro coins did not comply with this recommendation. No efforts were made to amend these coins to make them compliant.

King Willem Alexander
Queen Beatrix  abdicated on 30 April 2013, so the design of the coins was changed for her heir, King Willem-Alexander of the Netherlands. The new coins were made to be in accordance with this recommendation. 
The Royal Dutch Mint presented the new design to the public on 31 October 2013 and began releasing them into circulation in early 2014 (see ).
Production of the new coins commenced on 22 January 2014. The first coins were released into circulation the next day.

€2 commemorative coins

Other commemorative coins (Collectors' coins)

See also

 Dutch guilder
 Aruban florin
 Netherlands Antillean guilder
 Netherlands Indian guilder

References

External links

The visual characteristics of the Euro coins: The Netherlands Official Journal of the European Communities
European Central Bank – Netherlands

Euro coins by issuing country
Coins of the Netherlands
Euro